Henry Chakava (born 26 April 1946) is a Kenyan publisher. He has focused on the publication of books particularly in East Africa and has been called "the father of Kenyan publishing". For his contribution to educational and cultural literature in his region, he has received several awards.

Life 
Henry Miyinzi Chakava was born in Vokoli, Vihiga District. He began his career after completing his study in literature and philosophy in 1972. First he was editor and subsequently chief editor in Nairobi of the international publishing house Heinemann Educational Books, where he was involved in the publication and promotion of high-profile African writers including Ali Mazrui, Chinua Achebe, Marjorie Oludhe Macgoye, Meja Mwangi, Ngũgĩ wa Thiong'o and Okot p'Bitek.

In 1992 Chakava took over the Kenyan establishment and went further under the name East African Educational Publishers. Later, he expanded his business with establishments in Uganda and Tanzania.

He published a great number of educational and cultural books that have had a major importance in eastern Africa. For instance, he published the school books for primary and tertiary education that signified an important renewal in view of the subjects that were written from an African perspective. Previously, school books had been influenced greatly by a Western viewpoint.

Also in the cultural field, Chakava came with innovating publications. Besides books in the English language, he published in local languages, at a time when local languages were still seen by governments and authorities as state subversive. Furthermore he published books with a critic stance on local governments. Challenging the boundaries of the freedom of expression, he took great risks and in fact, was repeatedly threatened.

Moreover, he took the lead over the African Publishing Institute, and maintained contacts with important publishers in Oxford, England, such as the African Books Collective and Bellagio Publishing Network. Henry Chakava is also a visiting lecturer at the Oxford Brookes University.

He is the author of the 1996 book Publishing in Africa: One Man's Perspective, for which Chinua Achebe wrote a brief introduction.

To celebrate Henry Chakava's 70th birthday, a number of key personalities in the publishing world have authored a book, Coming of Age: Strides in African Publishing, published by East African Educational Publishers Ltd, Nairobi Kenya. The new release, published in April 2016, is a collection of essays in honour of Dr Henry Chakava @70.

Recognition 
Chakava received several awards. Here follows a selection:
1984: Award for extraordinary service to Kenya, by the Kenyan Head of State
2000: Zimbabwe International Book Fair Award
2005: Honorary doctorate of Oxford Brookes University
2006: Prince Claus Award

References

External links
 "JSO INTERVIEW, HENRY CHAKAVA, 23RD MAY PART 1", YouTube, 24 May 2013.
 "JSO INTERVIEW, HENRY CHAKAVA, 23RD MAY PART 2", YouTube, 24 May 2013.

Kenyan businesspeople
Kenyan publishers (people)
Living people
1946 births
People from Western Province (Kenya)
Alumni of Friends School Kamusinga